The Priory is a pub on Micklegate, in the city centre of York, in England.

The building originated as four tenements in a row of seven, constructed in the mid-14th century, probably before 1369.  From this period survives the jettying at the front, crown post roof trusses, and wattle and daub walls at attic level.  The section now forming the pub had attics added in the 17th-century, at which time a rear wing was added to what became 103 Micklegate.  That tenement was refaced in brick in the following century.

In the 19th-century, shop fronts were inserted at ground floor level, which largely survive, and 99 and 101 were combined into a single shop.  103 was created from two of the original tenements, and by 1818 it was the Coach and Horses pub.  In the early-20th century, the freehold of the pub became owned by Richard Pickard's Charity, and they sold it in 1945 to Joshua Tetley's & Son brewery.  The following year, they also purchased 99 and 101 Micklegate, and expanded the pub into them.

The rear wall of 99 and 101 was rebuilt in brick in 1958.  The remainder of the tenements were demolished in 1961.  In 1968, the building was grade II listed.  The pub was later renamed as The Coach, then the Phalanx and Firkin, and in 2003 as The Priory, after Micklegate Priory, the gateway to which neighboured the building.

References

External links

Grade II listed pubs in York
Buildings and structures completed in the 14th century
Micklegate